Kinder, Kinder was a German comedy television series. It consisted of one season with 9 episodes that was originally broadcast by RTL Television in 2006.

The plot is centered on the life of the three sisters Katja Eumann (Dana Golombek), Claudia Ziegler-De Vries (Judith Pinnow) and Jessica De Vries (Carolin Kebekus) and their families.

External links
 
 Kinder, Kinder at Brainpool TV (production company)

2006 German television series debuts
2006 German television series endings
German-language television shows
RTL (German TV channel) original programming